Athens Drive Magnet High School, formerly known as Athens Drive High School, is a secondary Wake County public high school in southwestern Raleigh, North Carolina that serves grades 9–12. As of 2020–2021, the school has 2,075 enrolled students and approximately 121 hired educators. It is also part of the Wake County Public School System.

History 
Athens Drive High School (ADHS) was opened on September 5, 1978. ADHS was then dedicated on April 11, 1979. The first graduating class was in 1979.

Athens Drive High School was the first high school in Wake County built for school and community use. It was the first high school built after the merger of Wake County Schools and Raleigh City Schools. It was designed by architect F. Carter Williams. The price tag of the ADHS building was $7.1 million. At the time, ADHS was the largest and most expensive high school built in North Carolina. The City of Raleigh paid $425,000 to construct Williams Stadium. Athens Drive is considered a small 4A school by NC standards. Originally, before the Jaguars were decided as the mascot for the school, the Owl was going to be the school's mascot.

In 1989, controversy surrounded the appointment of Paul J. Puryear, who was white, to replace Johnny Farmer, who was then one of two black high school principals in Wake County. In 1991, after R. Walter Sherlin was chosen to replace Puryear as another white principal, board member Dr. Holland walked out of the room in protest.

The school underwent a major refurbishment during the 2001–02 school year. A new wing was added to the school, originally called the Freshman Academy Wing, built specifically for freshman classes, but the name was later removed and the wing is now used for math and science classes for all grades. The main entrance was also moved. While the refurbishments occurred, all ADHS students were assigned to Middle Creek High School for the 2001–02 school year, which had not opened yet for its own students. The refurbished ADHS reopened in the fall of 2002.

In 2014 James "Jim" Hedrick, previously of Green Hope High School, became principal of Athens Drive. The school community paid tribute to him after he died on August 2, 2016. Hedrick and his wife Camille, then the principal of Panther Creek High School, had moved to North Carolina due to proximity to family members and since his wife is a local. Stephen Mares is the current principal. He replaced Dr. James Hedrick, after his death.

In September 2015, Athens Drive was selected by WCPSS to become a magnet school, starting from the 2016–17 school year.

In March 2020, the school was temporarily closed due to the COVID-19 pandemic. Classes were cancelled until April 13, 2020, when they resumed. However, the classes resumed exclusively online using Google Meet. The graduation for the class of 2020 was posted in a Youtube video as no in-person event could occur. The fall semester of the 2020–21 school year was fully online as well. Classes began to reopen in February 2021. Initially, students who opted for in-person learning were divided into 3 cohorts. The cohorts cycled weekly and shared mixed classes consisting of in-person students as well as the students attending on the Google Meet. Many safety protocols were enforced including required masks excluding lunchtime and 'mask breaks', socially distance classroom/lunch seating, temperature screening at arrival, and staggered dismissal. In April 2021, the school removed the cohorts and allowed all students signed for in-person learning to attend daily but classes were still mixed with the online students. Athens Drive kept the virtual academy for the 2021–22 school year, but the classes are no longer mixed with in-person students.

In 2021, Athens Drive became the first school in Wake County to obtain solar panels. The 12 solar panels were acquired from a NC GreenPower Solar+ Schools non-profit grant.

List of Principals

School profile 
As of the 2016–2017 school year, there were 1,934 students, a combination of 847 White, 509 African American, 375 Hispanic, 119 Asian, 6 Native American or Alaska Native, and 1 Native Hawaiian or Pacific Islander as well as 77 who were two or more races. 41.1% were eligible for the state's free or reduced lunch program. Athens Drive High School offers the following AP courses: Biology, Calculus AB, Calculus BC, Chemistry, Computer Science Principles, Computer Science, Environmental Science, European History, Human Geography, Language and Composition, Literature and Composition, Physics 1, Physics 2, Psychology, Spanish Language and Culture, Statistics, Studio Art: 2-D Design, Studio Art: 3-D Design, United States Government and Politics, and United States History.

It had a Child Development Center, which was called Baby Jags, served 3 and 4 year olds prior to their enrollment in kindergarten. It was shut down after the 2017–2018 school year. That classroom now houses the school's Animal Science program.

Athens Drive is a Wake County STEM High School. The school offers two STEM (Science, Technology, Engineering, and Math) academies: the STEM Academy of Energy and Sustainability, established in 2012, and the Health Science Academy, which was established in 1990, and is the basis for the magnification for the school, Athens Drive Magnet High School: Center for Medical Sciences and Global Health Initiatives.

Athens Drive is a Community School in the Wake County Public School System. There are night classes for adults offered all year and a community library that is open to the public.

Athens Drive operates on a 4x4 semester block schedule.

Fine arts 

Athens Drive offers a variety of instrumental, drama, vocal and visual art, as well as leadership development and community service. The school contains two art studios, a printing graphics studio and a yearbook/computer art studio. The Performing Arts facilities include the 1,000-seat theater, 150-seat choral room, 200-seat band room, and tech shops.

The band room is able to hold the marching band for rehearsals. The room features large stadium-style risers, two instrument storage rooms (percussion and marching horns) and low brass stations. The music library houses over 25,000 volumes of band, orchestra and choral literature and also serves as the storage library for the NC Band Masters Association's Central District's festival music. The current band director is Dr. Jerry Markoch.

The chorus room features large stadium-style risers and contains a supplemental music library, offices, and storage rooms for equipment. In March 2010, the symphonic band performed at the "Music For All" National Festival, sponsored by Bands Of America. The Wind Ensemble performed at the 2010 NC Music Educators Conference. In March 2014, the Wind Ensemble will travel to New York City and perform a concert at Carnegie Hall at the National Band and Orchestra Festival. They will perform a 30-minute concert for a panel of internationally known wind band conductors and composers. The band was chosen based on their past superior performance records and their appearances in the "Music for All" National Festival and at the NC Music Educators Conference.

The theater department won the Marchael Bayne Best Musical Award in 2019 for their musical All Shook Up. They also received four other nominations for 'Best Ensemble', two for 'Best Actor', and one for 'Best Actress.' The previous year they were nominated for their musical In The Heights for 'Best Ensemble', two for 'Best Actress' and one for 'Best Actor.'

Athletics 
The Jaguars compete in the Triangle-8 (TRI-8) Athletic Conference. Athens Drive offers the following sports:

 Baseball 
 Basketball (Men's and Women's)
 Cheerleading
 Cross Country
 Dance
 Football 
 Golf (Men's and Women's)
 Gymnastics
 Lacrosse (Men's and Women's)
 Soccer (Men's and Women's)
 Softball
 Swimming and Diving (Men's and Women's)
 Track and FieldIndoor & Outdoor (Men's and Women's)
 Tennis (Men's and Women's)
 Volleyball
 Wrestling

Athletic facilities 
The facilities of Athens Drive Athletics include:

 Peter Hines Williams Memorial Stadium This 2,500-seat stadium is currently home to the track team and was, until 2016, home to the football, soccer, and lacrosse teams, as well as the ADHS Cheerleaders and Marching Jaguars. Williams Stadium is often the site for regional track meets, soccer and lacrosse playoff games and community events. The stadium features a rubberized track service, restrooms, concessions, press box, overflow capacity setting and a new sound and lighting system installed for the 2007–2008 school year. As part of the Athens Drive athletic facilities improvements, Williams Stadium is currently being renovated due to safety concerns. The stadium will receive several updates, including a new track, handicapped accessible grandstands, press decks and a new drainage system around the field.
 Jaguar Stadium The brand-new Jaguar Stadium is home to the football, soccer, and lacrosse teams, opened in 2016. The new stadium, which has yet to be named, was recently sodded and lights have been installed. Construction began in April 2015, and the groundbreaking took place on May 20, 2015. The stadium was finished in August 2016.
 Tennis Courts The 8-court tennis park is home to the men's and Women's tennis teams, as well as the Annual North Carolina Games. The Tennis Courts are named the Alicia Jones Tennis Courts in honor of Alicia Jones who was a math teacher who died from Leukemia in 2007. The tennis courts are currently also being refurbished as part of the Athens Drive athletic facilities renovation project.
 Athens Drive Baseball Stadium The baseball stadium was constructed along with the original school building. It has bleacher seating for over 300 fans, a press box and concessions. It is located behind the school, near Lake Johnson Pool and behind the area of the new stadium under construction. It is set to receive a new scoreboard for the 2016 season as part of the Athens Drive athletic facilities renovation project.
 Softball Stadium Home of the Lady Jags Softball team, this field recently added new scoreboard systems to enhance gameplay.
 ADHS Jaguar Gymnasium The main gym (upper gym) is home to the basketball, wrestling and volleyball teams, and features bleachers for 1,500. Concessions and gift shops are located in the large lobby outside. Scoring and lighting systems were updated in 2005, and the sound system was updated in 2015.
 Lower Gym Originally the home of the wrestling team, the older gym is used today as a practice facility for all sports. Showers, lockers, football equipment rooms, officials and training rooms are located adjacent to the gym, as well as the ADHS Medical Trainer rooms. The Gym also serves as practice facilities for the Cheer squads and Marching Colorguard and Winterguard.
 Practice Facilities Athens Drive has several practice facilities ready for its various teams. The women's Lacrosse teams practice on fields located by the Softball pitch, and the Softball team uses practice cages nearby. Two large practice fields near the Baseball stadium are used by football and Men's soccer during the fall and Men's Lacrosse and Women's soccer during the spring. Located at the bottom of Jaguar Park Drive opposite Williams Memorial Stadium is the Band Practice field, used by the Marching Jaguars and the Cross Country team in the fall and the Lacrosse, Baseball, and Track teams in the spring. Lake Johnson Park, located next to Athens Drive High, also is used by Cross Country and Track.

Notable alumni 
Brian Ackley, professional soccer player
Nazmi Albadawi, Major League Soccer (MLS) player, also represents the Palestine national football team
 Adam Armour, professional soccer player
Shaker Asad, former MLS and USL First Division player
Bobbi Baker, actress who played Kiki in Tyler Perry's House of Payne
Rob Crisp, NFL offensive tackle
Steven Curfman, MLS player and member of United States U-17 and United States U-20 national soccer teams
Josh Davis, professional basketball player
Kevin Donnalley, NFL player and 2003 NFC champion with the Carolina Panthers
Donald Evans, NFL defensive end
Markeisha Gatling, WNBA player
Lex Gillette, Paralympic athlete and medalist
Josh Hamilton, 5x MLB All-Star selection and first overall pick in the 1999 MLB draft
Barbara Jackson, former North Carolina Supreme Court Justice
Roy Lassiter, MLS player and member of the United States men's national soccer team
Peter R. McCullough, astronomer and founder of the XO Project
Ariel McDonald, professional basketball player who played in the EuroLeague; 2000 Israeli Basketball Premier League MVP
Larry Pickett, television show creator, executive producer, host, and editor

References

External links 
 Official website

Wake County Public School System
Public high schools in North Carolina
Schools in Raleigh, North Carolina
Schools in Wake County, North Carolina
1978 establishments in North Carolina